The Workers' Party (abbreviation: WP) is a major centre-left political party in Singapore and is one of the three contemporary political parties represented in Parliament, alongside the governing People's Action Party (PAP) and opposition Progress Singapore Party (PSP). It is currently the largest opposition party in Parliament. It is also one of the two oldest parties active in the country, having contested every parliamentary election since 1959, the other being the PAP. The WP has been the only political party other than the PAP with elected Members of Parliament (MPs) since the 1991 general election.

The WP was founded in 1957 by David Marshall, having previously led the left-wing Labour Front to victory in the 1955 general election, forming a minority government and becoming the first Chief Minister of Singapore. He resigned as leader in 1956 after his delegation to London to negotiate for complete home rule and eventual independence failed and resigned his seat in 1957. Marshall returned as the first WP representative in the Legislative Assembly as Member for Anson in 1961.

The party thereafter declined in prominence during the 1960s and 1970s before its re-emergence in 1981, when then party leader J. B. Jeyaretnam became the first opposition Member of Parliament to be elected since Singapore's independence in 1965, having surprisingly defeated the candidate of the governing PAP at a by-election in Marshall's former constituency of Anson. He was re-elected at the 1984 general election, but subsequently lost his seat in Parliament in 1986 following a conviction for falsely accounting the party's funds, a conviction Jeyaretnam claimed was politically motivated. Prominent former members of the WP also include former Law Society President Francis Seow as well as socialist Lee Siew Choh.

Since the 1991 general election, the party's safe seat has been the constituency of Hougang, which was represented by Low Thia Khiang for two decades. The popularity of the party in Hougang has been attributed to the area's Teochew heritage and Low's personal affability. Low moved to the constituency of Aljunied for the 2011 general election, where he led the first team from an opposition party to win a group representation constituency (GRC), with the WP becoming the first Singapore opposition political party to win two adjacent constituencies and to elect the first female opposition MP. In 2012, then-Speaker of Parliament and incumbent PAP MP for Punggol East SMC, Michael Palmer, had resigned from his seat due to an extra-marital affair, triggering a by-election. The WP candidate, Lee Li Lian, who stood in the same constituency in 2011, was chosen to represent the party once again and was subsequently elected to become the first woman in Singapore's history to win a by-election. In the 2020 general election, the WP become the first opposition party to win multiple GRCs in a single general election. Sengkang GRC MP Raeesah Khan became the youngest MP and the first female minority opposition candidate elected into Parliament.

Positioning itself as a "check and balance" in Parliament while being on the centre-left of Singapore politics, the WP is ideologically social democratic. It supports a progressive approach to civic nationalism, reducing the voting age from 21 to 18 in line with most other established democracies, expanding the minimum wage policies to cover all sectors as well as providing more flexibility in regards to the Central Provident Fund (CPF). In recent years, members of the WP have worn light blue uniforms during political campaigning to represent the party's links to blue-collar workers.

History

1956: Foundation of the Workers' Party 
In 1956, Singapore's first Chief Minister, David Saul Marshall, resigned his leadership post for Labour Front (the largest party in the assembly at the time) following the failure of the Merdeka Talks that had sought self-governance for Singapore. Marshall remained as the party's backbencher in the Legislative Assembly until his resignation in 1957. On 3 November that year, Marshall went on to found Workers' Party.

1957–1965: City Council and Legislative Assembly elections 

Following the adoption of the Rendel and McNeice Commission recommendations, the six wards in the city area consisting of 18 elected seats was carved into 32. In 1957, the pro-communists backed two new entrants, the Workers' Party and the People's Action Party, which later went on to become the long-running governing party in Singapore. Their electoral debut was mostly a success as the party elected four members (out of the five contested) to the City Council; however, in 1958, Kallang ward incumbent Chang Yuen Tong resigned, and subsequently lost their seat to PAP as a result of their by-election defeat.

The party's first Legislative election in 1959 did not see success unlike the 1957 City Election, as Marshall failed to retake his seat from 1955 to 1957, Cairnhill constituency; it was won by former Chief Minister and Singapore People's Alliance leader Lim Yew Hock, and the WP did not win any of the three contested seats. That same election also saw PAP became the majority party for the very first time.

In May 1961, a by-election was precipitated due to the passing of Anson constituency's incumbent MP Baharuddin Mohammed Ariff. Marshall then went to declare his candidacy with the statement:

"... effective, vigorous and constructive opposition and to protect them against the arrogant dictatorship of unchallenged power. Marshall was also eager to assist the workers to prevent the political enslavement of trade unions and to revive the struggle against colonialism in seeking complete independence preferably within and, if necessary, without the Federation."

On 15 July, Marshall won the by-election and subsequently returned to the Legislative Assembly.

David Marshall, as Chairman of the party, made his views known on merger at public rallies and radio talks. Marshall's stand on merger was that:
"... Singapore should seek equal privileges and rights for its citizens in the new federation but surrender autonomy in education and labour, since different policies in these crucial areas would undermine the stability of Malaysia in the long run. He further maintained that if Singapore could not negotiate for a complete merger, she should seek independence on her own, a proposition which drew gales of laughter from the Legislative Chamber at that time. Marshall's strongest objection to the White Paper merger terms was on the point of citizenship and the implications of citizenship in the new federation. He saw the provisions as denying the Singapore citizen who was a federal national, the right of political participation in terms of being allowed to organise or contest in an election in the other states of the Federation. Singaporeans would in his view, be no more than favoured foreigners in the Federation, permitted to live and work there without visas, but also without the important constitutional guarantees that immigration barriers would not be raised against them."

The party concerned Marshall's issue of common citizenship and the rights of Singapore citizens when they joined the Federation. Marshall later stated on 20 August 1962:

"... issued a statement to advise his Executive Council and party members to accept the White Paper proposals for merger, but continued to oppose the Government on the referendum urging the people to cast blank votes on the grounds that it was undemocratically conducted."

1965–1986: Post independence, first opposition MP

On 9 August 1965, Singapore was declared as an independent sovereign state, and the Legislative was reformed as Parliament of Singapore. 1968 was the first post-independence election, which saw PAP winning every one of 58 contested seats (51 by a walkover, and the other seven on polling day), due to the election boycotting of the main opposition party at the time, the Barisan Sosialis, leading to the mass arrests of most of its leadership since 1963.

Having become a small and fairly insignificant party by the late-1960s, the party saw a rejuvenation by recruiting a group of lawyers, including J.B. Jeyaretnam, who became the party's Secretary-General. Despite fielding a large slate of candidates in succeeding elections, the ruling PAP still managed to retain the monopoly by winning every contested seats for the next three general elections (including by-elections) until 1981.

On 13 October 1981, Devan Nair vacated his Anson seat to assume his role as the nation's third President, and precipitated the by-election; on 31 October, the party's victory was noted as historic as candidate Jeyaretnam became the first opposition MP-elect to be elected in Parliament with 51.9% (7,012) of the valid votes cast, beating PAP's Pang Kim Hin's 47.1% (6,359) and UPF's Harbans Singh's 1.0% (131), marking the first time since 1961 the Anson electorate voted the WP into the assembly. Jeyaretnam then went on to hold the constituency in the 1984 elections with an increased margin of 56.8%.

However, two months later, Jeyaretnam was charged with falsely accounting the party's funds. In 1986, Senior District Judge Michael Khoo found Jeyaretnam innocent of all charges but one. The prosecution later appealed a retrial to be held in a different district court, which saw Jeyaretnam found guilty on all charges and resulted in his disqualification, though he subsequently remained as the party's Secretary-General, he was also barred from standing in elections until 1991.

1987–1991: Re-entry into Parliament
In 1987, some members were among a group of 22 people arrested by Singapore's Internal Security Department as part of Operation Spectrum, accused of being Marxists. They were released on condition that they kept out of politics.

Prior to the 1988 general elections, the party merged Barisan Sosialis and the Singapore United Front. The party did not win any constituency but came very close to winning the Eunos Group Representation Constituency (which was then a three-member constituency), in which the party's team, consisting of Francis Seow (a former head of the Bar Society who had become a thorn in the government's side and had briefly been detained under the Internal Security Act prior to the general election), Lee Siew Choh (a former chairman of the Barisan Sosialis and former PAP Assemblyman from 1959 to 1961) and Mohd Khalit bin Mohd Baboo, scored 49.1%; only one opposition MP was returned to Parliament (Chiam See Tong of the Singapore Democratic Party), and since the team garnered the highest percentage of the vote secured by losing opposition candidates at the election, the party was eligible to nominate two members of its team become Non-constituency MPs. The party had refused to nominate NCMPs in the past, but this time they nominated Lee and Seow to become NCMPs. While Lee took his post and became the first NCMP, Seow did not accept the offer after he was accused of espionage and fled to the United States shortly after the election. In Parliament, Lee took up several issues, including the Internal Security Act, living costs and welfare.

Jeyaretnam was sued for slander by the Prime Minister Lee Kuan Yew for comments he made at an election rally in 1988, and lost; Jeyaretnam was ordered to pay Lee damages of S$260,000 including costs.

1991–1997: Victory in Hougang

At the 1991 general election, Low Thia Khiang, who was then the party's Organising Secretary, and a previously-contested candidate under the Tiong Bahru GRC in his debut in 1988, was elected as the MP for Hougang SMC; defeating PAP's incumbent Tang Guan Seng by 10,621 votes (52.8%) to 9,487 (47.2%). The party had since held on Hougang SMC after the election.

During the election campaign, one of the WP's candidates in Eunos GRC, Jufrie Mahmood, drew particular fire from the PAP and then-Prime Minister Goh Chok Tong, accusing him of being a Malay chauvinist, an accusation Jufrie strongly denied. The party also polled strongly in Eunos GRC, but lost to the PAP's team with 47.6% of the votes to 52.4%; unlike the last election, no NCMPs were offered as the opposition (including Low) elected a combined four seats in parliament. Low became the Assistant Secretary-General following the election; during his tenure, Low was praised by the parliament on his assertiveness, good analytical ability and his willingness to be constructive rather than oppose for the sake of opposing.

A by-election in the Marine Parade Group Representation Constituency in 1992 was expected to mark the return of Jeyaretnam to electoral politics after his Parliamentary ban had expired; however, the team ultimately did not participate due to one of the candidates turned up late on the nomination day. In 1993, Jeyaretnam and another candidate, Tan Soo Phuan (now a member of Democratic Progressive Party), attempted to seek candidacy in the first-ever presidential election, but both candidates were denied from granting the Certificate of Eligibility, an item presidential candidates was required to complete their nominations.

In 1996, Jeyaretnam was sued and paid damages of S$465,000 and S$250,000 in court costs for an article he wrote in an issue of the party's newspaper, The Hammer, calling the PAP's Indian leaders a bunch of stooges. That same year, Lee Siew Choh resigned from the party, citing differences with Jeyaretnam.

1997–2006: Leadership transition from Jeyaretnam to Low

In the 1997 elections, Low was re-elected as Hougang MP at the 1997 general election. Besides Low, only one other opposition MP was elected (Chiam See Tong, who left SDP to join the Singapore People's Party); one NCMP was offered to the WP team for Cheng San Group Representation Constituency, who polled better than any other opposition losing candidates, with 45.2%; the party selected secretary-general (and candidate) Jeyaretnam as the NCMP, marking his return to the Parliament after 11 years.

During the election campaign, another candidate part of the WP's team in Cheng San, lawyer Tang Liang Hong, drew particular attention from the PAP, who accused him of being an anti-Christian and anti-Muslim Chinese chauvinist. Tang, who insisted all he was trying to do was to "better represent the Chinese community and ask questions on their behalf", vigorously denied this charge and accused the PAP of trying to win votes by sowing fear into the electorate. Tang also attacked the PAP on the issue of the Hotel Properties Ltd case (which started when the Stock Exchange of Singapore criticised Hotel Properties Ltd for its "tardiness" in disclosing details of sales of its condominium units to directors and their family members). Lee who had purchased one of the units, claimed that Tang was trying to milk this issue for political capital; the PAP sued Tang for both defamation and branding the PAP leadership as a bunch of liars, for a total of S$13.6 million of damages, and Tang shortly fled to Australia after the election.

Prior to the 2001 election, Jeyaretnam was discharged from his NCMP seat due to an undischarged bankruptcy (failing to keep up with payments of S$120,000 worth of damages owed from a libel suit brought by then-Prime Minister Goh Chok Tong and other PAP leaders following comments he had made at an election rally in 1997, but since fulfilled and discharged from bankruptcy in May 2007); Jeyaretnam relinquished his Secretary-General post to Low, which saw the party in bitter acrimony as Jeyaretnam later accused Low of not doing enough to help him pay the damages from the libel suit. In response, Low claimed that he had always looked upon Jeyaretnam as an elder and had done everything possible to help him. Following the renewal, a few members (including Jeyaretnam) left the party, and went to form Reform Party in 2008, which would be Jeyaretnam's final involvement in politics until his death three months after the founding.

Many observers speculated that with Low at the helm, WP would tone down its more hard-line stance and take on a more centrist outlook at the 2001 election. After Low assumed leadership, Low recruited a series of young members to the party, which include James Gomez, Yaw Shin Leong and Sylvia Lim (who would become the party's long-serving (and current) chairperson). Although Low was re-elected as Hougang MP at the 2001 general election, the party's fortunes reached a low as it only contested in two seats, in Hougang and Nee Soon East SMCs and had its entire Aljunied GRC team disqualified on Nomination Day.

2006–2011: Party renewal and electoral breakthrough

WP launched an updated manifesto in January 2006 entitled "You Have a Choice". The 52-page booklet outlined the party's stand on issues and policies, covering areas from economic and judicial policies to media and sports and recreation. The manifesto, which had last been updated in 1994, took one year to work on according to Low. PAP then panned the party's manifesto citing "time-bombs", in which the party quipped that its manifesto contained only time bombs which threatened the PAP's power.

At the 2006 general election, Low was elected as Hougang MP for the fourth time by an increased margin of 62.7%. The party also polled strongly in the Aljunied GRC, losing to the PAP's team with 43.9% of the vote to 56.1%, allowing the party to elect an NCMP seat by-virtue for their team being best-performing opposition losers, and the party's Chairman Lim was selected to become its first female NCMP. Another team of young first-time candidates, led by Yaw Shin Leong in Ang Mo Kio GRC helmed by Prime Minister Lee Hsien Loong, garnered a respectable 33.4% or one-third of the votes, slightly higher than the opposition's national average. Combining from all the votes received from the seven constituencies contested by 20 candidates, their popular vote was 38.4%; as compared to the second opposition party, the Singapore Democratic Alliance (the party also fielded the same number of candidates contesting the same number of constituencies), where the party got 32.5%, the party then became the largest opposition for the election, and leader Low succeeded Chiam as the new leader of the opposition.

The manifesto for the General Election 2011 was titled "Towards a First World Parliament", which also became their campaign slogan. One key proposal was for more affordable public housing such that Housing Development Board (HDB) lessees should be able to pay off their mortgage loans within 20 years rather than 30 years. Prior to nomination day (27 April 2011), Low announced that he would vacate his Hougang seat to former Ang Mo Kio GRC candidate Yaw Shin Long, and would contest in Aljunied GRC in the forthcoming election along with Lim and three of his "A-List" candidates (Taiwanese-born corporate lawyer Chen Show Mao, law postgraduate and former SAF major Pritam Singh, and freelance councillor Muhamad Faisal Manap). The party fielded a total of 23 candidates contesting in eight constituencies, the largest slate since 1988 (WP had the second-largest opposition slate, second only to another opposition party, National Solidarity Party (NSP), which fielded 24 candidates in eight constituencies).

On 7 May, the team in Aljunied GRC achieved another breakthrough for the party, with the first-ever GRC victory for any opposition party in history, with a score of 54.71% to unseat the PAP team led by then-Foreign Minister George Yeo and Minister of the Prime Minister's Office Lim Hwee Hua. The Hougang ward was also retained by Yaw with its best performance for the party at 64.80% of the votes (second only to Chiam's score of 69.6% back in 1991), resulting in six seats elected in Parliament. Their party's overall vote was its best performance in history, with 46.58% of the votes combined from the eight constituencies contested (second only to SDP's popular vote of 48.6% in 1991). Additionally, the election of chairwoman Lim and Manap, became the first female and former NCMP and Malay opposition MP, respectively, to be elected into Parliament.

Due to an increase of minimum opposition seats from three to nine, the party also won two of the three NCMP seats, which they elect Gerald Giam and Yee Jenn Jong (who contested East Coast Group Representation Constituency and Joo Chiat Single Member Constituency, respectively), bringing a total representation of eight seats, the most for any opposition party in Singapore since independence. Following the elections on 12 June, the party launched its grassroots arm for Aljunied GRC, called the Aljunied Constituency Committee. It also combined the Hougang and Aljunied town councils to form the Aljunied–Hougang Town Council.

2012–2013: Hougang and Punggol East by-elections 

On 15 February 2012, the party expelled Hougang SMC MP Yaw Shin Leong, for failing to account for allegations made against him. Prior to his expulsion, Yaw was accused of several indiscretions in his private life, as well as party misconduct surfaced earlier that year; Yaw had up to 24 February to appeal against his expulsion, but declined, eventually precipitated the by-election which was due to be held on 26 May. The seat was retained by former East Coast GRC candidate Png Eng Huat with a majority of 62.08%. Shortly after the elections, Poh Lee Guan was also expelled from the party after Poh attempt to contest the by-election as a "backup candidate" without consulting the party's CEC, and the CEC condemned Poh's reason as unacceptable.

On 12 December, another by-election was called due to the vacation of Punggol East SMC's MP and former speaker Michael Palmer for indiscretions with a People's Association staff; the party announced the candidacy shortly after the announcement.

Prior to nomination day, the party announced plans to purchase its own premises as its current rented premises at Syed Alwi Road was too small for its operations. Sufficient funds were eventually raised and the new HQ was opened in 2017, coinciding the party's 60th anniversary.

On 16 January 2013, the party fielded Lee Li Lian, a candidate previously contested the same ward on the 2011 election. On 26 January, Lee was elected to the parliament with 54.52% of the votes (her PAP rival Koh Poh Koon got 43.71%, and two other smaller parties 1.77%), marking their second by-election since 1981 the party won another parliamentary seat from the PAP.

2015–2016: Leadership renewal 

Ahead from the 2015 elections, coinciding the nation's golden jubilee, the party announced that it would contest 28 seats (from the ten constituencies), slightly under a third of the 89 parliamentary seats. They revealed their slogan for the election entitled "Empower Your Future". In August 2015, chairwoman Lim confirmed the first batch of candidates, consist of all seven elected MPs, would defend their respective constituencies. By the end of the month, the party's lineup were unveiled and finalised.

On 11 September, the team for Aljunied GRC and Hougang SMC were re-elected for another term in Parliament, but by a reduced winning margin of 50.95% and 57.69%, respectively, while Punggol East SMC's candidate Lee was defeated in her re-election bid to PAP's candidate and Deputy Speaker Charles Chong by a vote count of 51.76%–48.24%. Their party's overall vote (based on the ten constituencies contested, all of them were higher than the opposition's national average of 30.14%) fell from 46.58% down to 39.75% as well.

Consequently, the party became the only opposition party to represent in the Parliament for the first time since 1981–84, as the party won all the three NCMPs and formed an opposition of nine. Lee was the first of the three NCMPs but declined the offer; Fengshan SMC's candidate Dennis Tan was next in line for the second NCMP seat, while the party's East Coast GRC team nominated Leon Perera for the third seat. Following Lee's decline of offer, the party announced that they would nominate Daniel Goh as the third NCMP should the Parliament allow another appointment for NCMP. The appointment was approved by the PAP legislature on 29 January 2016, allowing Goh to be elected NCMP on an announcement from the Election Department on 4 February.

On 29 May 2016, leader Low successfully fended off an unprecedented challenge for his Secretary-General post by Chen for the first time in the party's history. Chen was re-appointed by Low in his previous position as Treasurer for another three months from 7 June 2016 until 9 September 2016, as he had already served two terms in the post. On 7 June, the party appointed Pritam Singh as Assistant Secretary-General.

2017–2018: AHTC lawsuits and election of new Secretary-General 

On 26 July 2017, the Aljunied–Hougang Town Council, which had appointed an independent panel of three lawyers at the behest of MND and HDB, was suing town council chairman Singh, vice-chairman Lim, party's leader Low, and three others including the town council's former managing agent, for improper payments made to the MA.

On 29 September, the party's headquarters were relocated from Syed Alwi Road to the Teambuild Centre, located at Geylang Road.

On 3 November, an anniversary dinner was held on Harbourfront Centre, marking a milestone of 60 years since the founding of the party on 3 November 1957. On the same night, Low announced on his speech that he would step down from his role of Secretary-General and would not seek candidacy for the next CEC's election the following year. A commemorative biographical book for the party, Walking With Singapore, was launched at bookstores the following day.

Singh was elected to the post of Secretary-General unopposed on 8 April 2018 after Low decided to step down for leadership renewal.

On 26 July, the Party was among the nine opposition parties invited for a gathering led by former PAP member and Presidential candidate Tan Cheng Bock, but the party did not attend. WP later revealed that the party was "going through a leadership transition and is focused on organisation building to better serve Singaporeans".

On 3 October, a $33.7 million trial between Aljunied–Hougang Town Council and former leader Low, Chair Lim, secretary-general Singh as well as two other town councilors was initiated. The trial went on until 25 October, where the three politicians launched an appeal to fund their legal fees, citing that they had depleted their personal resources after paying their lawyers close to S$600,000 for work done before the trial. Three days later, they closed their fundraising appeal after raising more than S$1 million for legal fees, while thanking the public for their support.

2020: Further gains and inroads

Ahead of the elections on 10 July 2020, the party introduced their slogan, "Make Your Vote Count" along with the 12 faces from the party, which included ex-NSP candidate Nicole Seah. During nominations, they fielded a total of 21 candidates to contest in six constituencies, including the newly formed Sengkang GRC (a constituency formed from the Punggol East SMC and Sengkang West SMC and fractions from Pasir Ris-Punggol GRC), as well as Aljunied GRC and Hougang SMC.

Ex-secretary general Low Thia Khiang, along with two incumbents Chen Show Mao and Png Eng Huat, were not contesting the election, with Low not running elections for the first time after a 32-year career; Low was earlier hospitalized on 30 April due to a head injury he sustained and was on rehabilitation. They were respectively replaced by NCMPs Gerald Giam, Leon Perera and Dennis Tan to complete the team lineup. Two other candidates previously elected in parliament, namely former NCMP Daniel Goh and former Punggol East MP Lee Li Lian, did not stand for the election.

During campaigning, Sengkang GRC candidate Jamus Lim received critical acclaim during the live debate which was held on 1 July for his debating skills and charisma. On 5 July, two separate police reports were lodged against Raeesah Khan (another Sengkang GRC candidate) both for alleged comments relating to discrimination of race and religion, in which she explained to the media to promote awareness while also expressing remorse on posting insensitive comments. Raeesah was eventually warned by the Singapore Police Force on 17 September 2020.

On 10 July, the Workers' Party surpassed their best performance from the 2011 election having won a total of 10 seats and garnered 50.49% of votes in constituencies they contested, making it the best-performing opposition party to date that surpasses the previous record held by SDP in 1991, which got 48.6%; the party increased their margins in Aljunied GRC and Hougang SMC with 59.95% and 61.21% respectively, while also capturing the new Sengkang GRC with a 52.12% vote, making it the second GRC to be captured by any opposition party. Unlike the past three elections, the party was not offered NCMPs seats as their result for the best performing losing constituency of East Coast GRC (46.61%) was not enough to be awarded a seat, falling behind West Coast GRC (led by the Progress Singapore Party) which garnered 48.32%.

Following the election, Hougang SMC became the first constituency to be elected by the opposition for seven terms, while Singh was appointed as the official Leader of the Opposition by Prime Minister Lee Hsien Loong, with the role previously being unofficial in the past.

On 27 December, five months after the elections, another CEC election was held at Clarke Quay, with Lim and Singh re-elected as Chair and Secretary-General respectively. All four Sengkang GRC members, as well as Nicole Seah and Kenneth Foo were elected into the CEC, while former MPs Chen, Goh and Lee, as well as Firuz Khan, John Yam and Terence Tan, stepped down.

On 30 November 2021, Sengkang MP Raeesah Khan resigned from Workers' Party and as a Member of Parliament after investigations into lying during parliamentary speeches on women's empowerment, which happened three months earlier. Two days later, the Workers' Party Central Executive Committee said they knew about the lies the week after her speech, but they decided to let her set the record straight after knowing her circumstances. Furthermore, the Party leaders voted overwhelmingly to ask Raeesah to resign even before she did so, with expulsion if she did not resign. Instead, Raeesah informed Pritam she would resign, before the Central Executive Committee met on the matter. In addition, the MPs of Sengkang GRC will not step down for a by-election, with the responsibilities of Compassvale divided accordingly. Workers' Party Vice-Chair and Aljunied GRC MP Faisal Manap will also act as an advisor to the Sengkang MPs.

Ideology

The Workers' Party brands itself as a credible, constructive and rational opposition party in Parliament that does not simply "oppose for the sake of opposing". It wishes to hold the government into account for any issues concerning Singaporeans and where Singaporeans are able to exercise their rights in political participation.

For starters, when policies presented in Parliament benefit Singaporeans on both sides of the political spectrum, it pledges to support it. However, if such policies are insufficient and does not benefit or put Singaporeans at a disadvantage, it will voice out on behalf of Singaporeans in parliamentary debates to seek a compromise. The party has also promised that its MPs will ask "hard questions" that the governing PAP MPs will not mention in Parliament, such as the corruption scandal in Brazil of the Keppel Offshore & Marine branch of Keppel Corporation, a government-linked corporation conglomerate which was founded by Temasek Holdings.

Historically influenced by Keynesian economics, the party favours government intervention in the economy and some redistribution of wealth. Taxation was seen as a means to achieve a "major redistribution of wealth and income" in previous manifestos. The party also desires increased rights for Singaporean workers and a welfare state, such as allocating greater expenditures towards the country's public healthcare system.

In general, the Workers’ Party's core ideology is centre-left, with some more leftist factions. The Workers' Party pledged in its manifesto to support the middle, working and other lower classes.

Whereas the party leans left in general, it has also advocated for a more centrist calibrated approach in regards to immigration. It has, for instance, proposed that the overall number of foreign workers should be capped if Singapore can achieve a 1% annual growth rate in the local workforce.

Leadership

List of chairpersons

List of secretaries-general

Central Executive Committee
As of 15 November 2022, the Central Executive Committee comprises the following members:

Former elected members

Former Members of City Council of Singapore (1957–1959)

Former Members of Legislative Assembly of Singapore (1955–1965)

Former Members of Parliament of Singapore (1965–present)

Current Members of Parliament

Electoral history

City Council

City Council by-elections

Legislative Assembly

Legislative Assembly by-elections

Parliament

Parliament by-elections

 Marshall did not contest the 1957 city elections.
 Chiang did not contest in the 1968 election.
 Jeyaretnam did not contest the 1988 and 1991 elections due to pressed charges.
 A candidate who was offered a post in the NCMP was disqualified shortly before accepting the offer due to pressed charges.

Notes

See also 

 Labour movement of Singapore
 List of political parties in Singapore
 Politics of Singapore
 Social democracy

References

Citations

Sources 
 Books

External links

Official website of The Workers' Party Youth Wing

1957 establishments in Singapore
Democratic socialist parties in Asia
Political parties established in 1957
Political parties in Singapore
Progressive parties
Social democratic parties in Asia
Socialist parties in Singapore